Mera Me Ti Mera (Greek: Μέρα με τη μέρα) or Opa Opa (in Scandinavia) is the debut album by Greek musical group Antique.  The album was released in 1999 by V2 Records in Greece, and by Bonnier Music in Scandinavia.

Track listing

Singles
"Opa Opa"
"Opa Opa" was the first CD single from the album and the debut song by Antique. It included the radio edit and an extended version along with the B-side "Rhythmos". "Opa Opa" reached gold certification in Sweden.

"Dinata Dinata"
"Dinata Dinata" was the second CD single from the album. It was a cover of Eleftheria Arvanitaki's song of the same name and was sung at the closing ceremony for the 2004 Olympics, during the fireworks after the flame was extinguished.

"Mera Me Ti Mera"
"Mera Me Ti Mera" was the third single from the album. It was released as a CD single with an extended version and a music video was made.

References

1999 debut albums
Antique (band) albums
Greek-language albums
V2 Records albums

sv:Opa Opa